The Cima Verosso (2,444 m) is a mountain of the Pennine Alps, located west of Bognanco in the Italian region of Piedmont. It lies on the range east of the Portjengrat between the Val Divedro and the Valle di Bognanco. Its summit lies just east of the watershed and border with the Swiss canton of Valais.

On its western (Swiss side), the mountain overlooks the lake Tschawinersee.

References

External links
 Cima Verosso on Hikr

Mountains of the Alps
Mountains partially in Switzerland
Italy–Switzerland border
International mountains of Europe